Farangis or Frigis is a female character in the Persian epic Shahnameh. She is the eldest daughter of Afrasiab, king of Turan. She is also the second and favourite wife of Siyâvash, the saintlike prince of Iran (Siyâvash's first wife was Juraira daughter of Piran Viseh) and mother of a legendary hero and later Shah of Iran, Kai Khosrow. Although a Turanian by birth, Farangis shows loyalty to her husband's kingdom and dynasty. She accompanies her son when he leaves Turan in the hopes of gathering an Iranian army to avenge Siyâvash.

After the murder of her husband Siyâvash and being left with her son Kai Khosrow, Farangis mourns him for a year. The dignitaries at the court of King Kavus try to console her. They promise that her brother-in-law Fariborz will avenge the murder of his brother. Further, they present Fariborz as a suitable husband for her. Aided by Rostam, Fariborz takes Farangis to his seraglio.

References

 Abolqasem Ferdowsi, Dick Davis trans. (2006), Shahnameh: The Persian Book of Kings , modern English translation (abridged), current standard. See also
 Davis, Dick, (translator), The Legend of Seyavash, (Penguin, 2001, Mage Publishers 2004) (abridged)
 Levy, Reuben (translator), The Epic of the Kings: Shah-Nama, the National Epic of Persia, (Mazda Publications, 1996) (abridged prose version)
 Warner, Arthur and Edmond Warner, (translators) The Shahnama of Firdausi, 9 vols. (London: Keegan Paul, 1905-1925) (complete English verse translation)
 Shirzad Aghaee, Nam-e kasan va ja'i-ha dar Shahnama-ye Ferdousi(Personalities and Places in the Shahnama of Ferdousi, Nyköping, Sweden, 1993.

Shahnameh characters